Platinum Categorisation is a category within the FIA Drivers' Categorisation. The FIA Drivers' Categorisation is a system created by Fédération Internationale de l'Automobile that lists drivers on the basis of their achievements, performances and age. This categorization is used in sports car racing championships such as FIA World Endurance Championship, IMSA WeatherTech SportsCar Championship, European Le Mans Series, etc. The previously separate FIA WEC and FIA GT3 lists were merged in 2015. The initial categorisation is based on the driver's age and his or her career record. Series that use FIA rankings must agree to submit the relevant data back to the FIA.

Requirements for Platinum categorisation
Driver rankings are revised annually and issued in December.

Professional driver, who meets at least two of the following criteria:

(Only the 2022 series names are listed in this summary; the historical equivalent series also count in most cases.)

General 
 Satisfies 3 or more Gold criteria
 Holds a FIA Super Licence (excluding practice licences);
 Factory driver, paid by a car manufacturer or official importer, with results to match; this includes drivers supplied to supported teams, and appearances for a single or low number of races;

Competition Results 
 24 Hours of Le Mans or FIA World Endurance Championship winner in a professional category (Hypercar / LMP1 / LMGTE Pro);
 Top-five finisher in the general classification in the IndyCar Series, the FIA Formula 2 Championship; all FIA World Championships  (including Formula E as of 2021) and WeatherTech SportsCar Championship (P only);
 Top-three finisher in the general classification of a Formula Three international series (FIA F3,  FIA Formula 3 European Championship), or major international single-seater championship (FIA Formula Two Championship, World Series by Nissan/Formula Renault 3.5, Formula Nippon/Super Formula Championship etc.);
 Winner of the Supercars Championship;
 Winner of the IMSA WeatherTech SportsCar Championship in a Professional category (P or DPi) (unlike WEC / Le Mans, a Daytona 24 win alone will not count);
 Winner of the NASCAR Cup;
 Winner of the Porsche Supercup;

Age 
 Drivers over 50 have grades reduced by additional rules; thus no driver over 50 may be categorised above Gold.

Discretionary 
Drivers whose performances and achievements, despite not being covered by one of the definitions above, may be considered as Platinum by the FIA.

Current drivers
This list was last revised 2 February 2021 and includes 182 drivers, who held the Platinum license.

References

External links
FIA DRIVER CATEGORISATION
FIA Reveals First 2015 Global Driver Ratings List

Endurance motor racing
Lists of auto racing people